The Roman Catholic Diocese of Purwokerto is a diocese located in the city of Purwokerto in the Ecclesiastical province of Semarang in Indonesia. It administers parishes on the western side of Central Java province up to Batang, Wonosobo and Purworejo regencies at its eastern borders.

History
 April 25, 1932: Established as Apostolic Prefecture of Purwokerto, on territory split off from the then Apostolic Vicariate of Batavia
 October 16, 1941: Promoted as Apostolic Vicariate of Purwokerto
 January 3, 1961: Promoted as Diocese of Purwokerto

Leadership, in reverse chronological order
 Bishops of Purwokerto (Roman rite), below
 Bishop Christophorus Tri Harsono (July 14, 2018 – present)
 Bishop Julianus Kemo Sunarko, S.J. (May 10, 2000 – December 29, 2016)
 Bishop Paschalis Soedita Hardjasoemarta, M.S.C. (December 17, 1973 – May 23, 1999)
 Bishop Guillaume Schoemaker, M.S.C. (see below January 3, 1961 – December 17, 1973)
 Vicar Apostolic of Purwokerto (Roman Rite), below 
 Bishop Guillaume Schoemaker, M.S.C. (May 31, 1950 – January 3, 1961 see above)
 Prefect Apostolic of Purwokerto (Roman Rite), below
 Fr. Bernardo Visser, M.S.C. (May 18, 1932 – 1941)

References
 GCatholic.org
 Catholic Hierarchy

Roman Catholic dioceses in Indonesia
Christian organizations established in 1932
Roman Catholic dioceses and prelatures established in the 20th century